Coralville Transit is an American public transit system serving Coralville, Iowa, as well as providing service into downtown Iowa City via the University of Iowa campus. In addition, a one-way route to and from North Liberty runs twice a day on weekdays during the morning and evening rush hours. The service provides several routes connecting downtown Iowa City with various destinations in Coralville, such as Coral Ridge Mall, Iowa River Landing, and Commerce Drive. It is one of three transit systems in the Iowa City area, the other two being Iowa City Transit and the University of Iowa Cambus, and Coralville Transit shares several stops with them.

Routes 
Coralville Transit provides 6 routes that run between downtown Iowa City, the University of Iowa campus, and various destinations in Coralville. 4 of these routes (routes 20-23) are weekday routes, one of which is a commuter route that runs once during the morning and afternoon rush hours to North Liberty (route 22). There is also a weeknight route (route 24) and a Saturday route (route 25), which are identical to each other in the route they run. All routes originate and terminate at the Iowa City Downtown Interchange (except for route 22, which originates near the Coralville Transit garage for its morning run, and terminates there for its evening run), and routes 20, 22, 24, and 25 serve the Coralville Transit Intermodal Facility at Iowa River Landing.

Route list

Former Routes 
Prior to October 19, 2020, Coralville Transit consisted of several unnumbered routes, including an express route that served residential areas north of Interstate 80.

Bus tracking 
Like Iowa City Transit and Cambus, Coralville Transit uses the Transit app to show estimated arrival times at stops and precise locations of buses on the map. Prior to 2019, the BONGO (Bus on the Go) system was used for bus tracking on the three transit systems in the Iowa City area.

Fleet

References

External Links 
Coralville Transit official website

Bus transportation in Iowa
Coralville, Iowa